Nuredin Loxha (1935–1992) is a Kosovar Albanian librettist, set designer, production designer and costume designer. He was born in Peć, Kosovo, then part of the Kingdom of Yugoslavia, and died in Pristina.

Career
Nuredin Loxha made a name for himself as an extremely talented art director involved in film, theatre, drama, television and set design for ballets.

Filmography

As art director
 Njeriu prej dheut (1984)
 Përroi vërshues (1981)
 Pasqyra (1977) (TV)
 Bujku (1973) (TV)

As set designer
 Kur pranvera vonohet (1980) (TV series)

As production designer
 Prva ljubav (1970)

As costume designer
 Uka i Bjeshkëve të nemura (1968)

Non-film work

As librettist
 Sokoli e Mirusha (ballet), 1974–1976

As costume designer
 Sokoli e Mirusha (ballet), 1974–1976

Sources
 

1935 births
1998 deaths
Ballet librettists
Set designers
Production designers
Costume designers
People from Peja